The United States House of Representatives elections in California, 1882 was an election for California's delegation to the United States House of Representatives, which occurred as part of the general election of the House of Representatives on November 7, 1882. California gained two seats as a result of the 1880 Census, which were at-large districts for this election, becoming the new 3rd and 6th districts in 1884. Democrats won both at-large seats. Of California's existing districts, Democrats won both Republican-held districts.

Overview

Delegation Composition

Results

District 1

District 2

District 3

District 4

Districts At-large

See also
48th United States Congress
Political party strength in California
Political party strength in U.S. states
United States House of Representatives elections, 1882

References
California Elections Page
Office of the Clerk of the House of Representatives

Sources
Dubin, Michael J. (1998). United States Congressional elections, 1788-1997 : the official results of the elections of the 1st through 105th Congresses. Jefferson, N.C.: McFarland, 1998.

External links
California Legislative District Maps (1911-Present)
RAND California Election Returns: District Definitions

1882
United States House of Representatives
California